Phillip Clay Wagner (born December 18, 1945) is a retired American professional basketball player who spent one season in the American Basketball Association (ABA) for the Indiana Pacers during the 1968–69 season. He attended the Georgia Institute of Technology. 

He lives in Stockbridge, Georgia with his wife Brenda. He is retired from Delta Air Lines, and is a real estate agent with Coldwell Banker in McDonough, Georgia. He has three living sons (one deceased son) and six grandsons.

External links

1945 births
Living people
American men's basketball players
Atlanta Hawks draft picks
Basketball players from Kentucky
Georgia Tech Yellow Jackets men's basketball players
Indiana Pacers players
People from Cynthiana, Kentucky